Djiman Waidi Koukou (born 14 November 1990) is a Beninese professional footballer who plays as a midfielder for French club Les Herbiers VF.

Club career
Born in Porto-Novo, Koukou played for Requins de l'Atlantique FC and Soleil FC in his country. On 5 July 2009, he signed with Thonon Évian F.C. in France, going on to play two seasons in the third division.

After a successful year with US Créteil-Lusitanos, Koukou joined Portuguese club S.C. Beira-Mar in late June 2011, on a free transfer. He was immediately loaned to Segunda Liga team C.F. Os Belenenses, appearing in slightly more than half of the games during his only campaign.

Koukou failed to break into the first team with the Aveiro side, and returned to France in the summer of 2012. He trained with amateurs UMS Montélimar for several months, and eventually signed in February 2013.

In January 2013, Koukou went on trial with Chamois Niortais F.C. from Ligue 2. After training for 15 days, he was offered a contract until the end of the season by manager Pascal Gastien, and went on to compete with the team in three and a half second level seasons whilst playing 125 matches across all competitions.

In early July 2016, Koukou joined RC Lens – also of the French division two – on a two-year deal. He scored his first and only league goal for them on 28 November 2017, helping the hosts defeat AC Ajaccio 2–0.

Koukou moved to the Romanian Liga I on 28 September 2018, agreeing to a two-year contract at FC Astra Giurgiu. One year later, he returned to France and its third tier by signing with recently relegated Red Star FC.

International career
Koukou made his debut for Benin in 2008, being selected for that year's Africa Cup of Nations. He earned his first cap on 7 September, in a 3–2 home win against Angola for the 2010 FIFA World Cup qualifiers.

Career statistics

Club

References

External links

1990 births
Living people
People from Porto-Novo
Beninese footballers
Association football midfielders
Ligue 2 players
Championnat National players
Championnat National 2 players
Liga Portugal 2 players
Liga I players
Requins de l'Atlantique FC players
Soleil FC players
Thonon Evian Grand Genève F.C. players
US Créteil-Lusitanos players
S.C. Beira-Mar players
C.F. Os Belenenses players
UMS Montélimar players
Chamois Niortais F.C. players
RC Lens players
FC Astra Giurgiu players
Red Star F.C. players
Les Herbiers VF players
Benin international footballers
2008 Africa Cup of Nations players
2010 Africa Cup of Nations players
Beninese expatriate footballers
Beninese expatriate sportspeople in France
Expatriate footballers in France
Beninese expatriate sportspeople in Portugal
Expatriate footballers in Portugal
Beninese expatriate sportspeople in Romania
Expatriate footballers in Romania